Ian Aspinall (born 1961) is a British actor. He played Mubbs Hussein in Holby City from 2001 to 2005, and has also appeared in City Central, The Bill, Silent Witness, Peak Practice, Waterloo Road and Casualty. He also had another role in East Is East playing eldest son Nazir Khan.<ref>Local lad Ian heads for super-stardom. Bolton Evening News, 13 December 1999.</ref> He was also the first actor to portray Darren Whateley, the man responsible for the stabbing of Brian Tilsley in Coronation Street''. Aspinall was born in Bolton, Lancashire to Pakistani immigrants.

References

External links

1961 births
Living people
Date of birth missing (living people)
English male television actors
Actors from Bolton
English people of Pakistani descent
English male actors of South Asian descent